Ephebe is a genus of lichen in the family Lichinaceae.

Species
Ephebe epheboides 
Ephebe fruticosa 
Ephebe hispidula 
Ephebe lanata 
Ephebe tasmanica

References

External links

Lichinomycetes
Ascomycota genera
Lichen genera
Taxa described in 1825
Taxa named by Elias Magnus Fries